IRIS (Intelligent Roadway Information System) is an open-source Advanced Traffic Management System (ATMS) software project developed by the Minnesota Department of Transportation. It is used by transportation agencies to monitor and manage interstate and highway traffic. IRIS uses the GPL license.

Functional areas
 Variable speed limit monitoring and control
 Active traffic management and lane control
 Congestion Detection
 Automated Warning System (AWS)
 Road Weather Information Systems (RWIS) / Environmental Sensor Stations (ESS)
 Dynamic message sign monitoring and control
 Ramp meter monitoring and control
 Traffic camera monitoring and control
 Vehicle Detector Stations (VDS) for monitoring real-time vehicle speed, flow, density
 Toll tags
 Incident tracking, monitoring, and storage
 Data export: real-time traffic, incidents, configuration, etc.
 Integrated mapping

Supported hardware devices

 DMS
 NTCIP Class A, B, C
 ADDCO Inc.
 Daktronics Inc.
 McCain Inc.
 SES America Inc., full matrix DMS, character matrix DMS
 Skyline: full sized DMS, VSL, scroll signs
 Wanco portable DMS
 DMS XML: a simple XML protocol for interfacing with external DMS systems
 Road Weather Information System
 NTCIP 1204 device driver, validated with:
 Lufft Lcom
 Campbell Scientific CR1000
 Vaisala dmc586
 QTT LX-RPU Elite
 High Sierra Electronics ESS
 Optical Scientific ORG-815 Optical Rain Gauge
 SSI
 Traffic cameras
 PTZ: Manchester, Pelco D, Vicon, Infinova
 Switchers: Pelco, Vicon
 VDS
 Canoga
 Wavetronix SmartSensor 105
 Wavetronix SmartSensor 125
 EIS RTMS (UDP)
 EIS G4
 Caltrans URMS 2070: UDP, TCP, TCP Re-ID
 Sensys
 Tag readers
 Bluetooth: Iteris Velocity
 Bluetooth: Acyclica
 Transcore Encompass 6 Multiprotocol Reader

Minneapolis / Saint Paul IRIS System
The IRIS implementation in the Minneapolis – Saint Paul region consists of:
 DMS: 135
 VDS: 5452
 RWIS: 4
 Cameras: 476
 Ramp meters: 433
 LCS: 194 (most can also be used as DMS)
 Lane marking: 1 (in-road lighting)
 Static sign with wig-wag beacons: 2

Gallery

Transportation agencies using IRIS
 Minnesota Department of Transportation
 California Department of Transportation
 Nebraska Department of Transportation
 Wyoming Department of Transportation
 Wisconsin Department of Transportation

See also
 Traffic flow
 Traffic congestion

External links 
IRIS Administrator Guide
IRIS Github Repository
IRIS Release Notes
Minnesota Department of Transportation IRIS Site
AHMCT / California Department of Transportation IRIS Site
IRIS Discussion Group

Cross-platform free software
Free software programmed in Java (programming language)
Intelligent transportation systems
Transportation engineering
Road traffic management
Software using the GPL license